The National Defense Mobilization Commission (abbreviated NDMC) is an organization under the State Council of the People's Republic of China and the Central Military Commission responsible for coordinating decisions concerning military affairs, strategic plans and defense mobilization. It is responsible for bringing together civic resources in the event of a war, and coordinating these efforts with military operations. The commission is usually chaired by the Premier of the People's Republic of China. It was established by the "National Defense Mobilization Law" in November 1994.

Since 2018, Premier Li Keqiang has served as chairman of the commission, with State Council Secretary-General Xiao Jie and Defense Minister Wei Fenghe as vice chairmen, and Lieutenant General Liu Faqing as secretary-general.

Departments 
The National Defense Mobilization Commission has several departments to carry out specific duties:
 NDMC General Office
 NDMC Equipment Department
 NDMC Anti-aircraft Department
 NDMC Communications Department
 NDMC Economy Department

References

See also 

 Military of the People's Republic of China
 Central Military Commission (China)
 National Defense Mobilization Department of the Central Military Commission
 State Council of the People's Republic of China
 Ministry of National Defense of the People's Republic of China
 Ministry of Veterans Affairs of the People's Republic of China
 State Administration for Science, Technology and Industry for National Defence

State Council of the People's Republic of China
Government agencies of China
Government agencies established in 1994
1994 establishments in China
Central Military Commission (China)